Glen Livingstone (born 13 October 1972) is an English former professional footballer who played as a goalkeeper. Born in Birmingham, Livingstone played in the Football League for Walsall after spells with  Aston Villa and York City.

Livingstone was part of England's squads for the European U18 Championship in 1990 and the World Youth Championship in 1991.

References

External links
Glen Livingstone's Bio

1972 births
Living people
Footballers from Birmingham, West Midlands
English footballers
Association football goalkeepers
Aston Villa F.C. players
York City F.C. players
Walsall F.C. players
Cheltenham Town F.C. players
English Football League players